The Very Best of Santana – Live in 1968 is a (double CD) live album by Santana, recorded in 1968 and released in 2007 on the Mastersong (Australian) label.

Track listing

Disc one
"Jingo" – (Babatunde Olatunji) 
"Everyday I Have the Blues" 
"La Puesta Del Sol" 
"Hot Tamales" 
"Acapulco Sunrise" 
"Soul Sacrifice" 
"With a Little Help from My Friends" 
"Latin Tropical"
"Let's Get Ourselves Together"

Disc two
"Evil Ways" 
"Persuasion" – (Gregg Rolie)
"As the Years Go By" 
"Jam in E" 
"Santana Jam" 
"Travellin' Blues" 
"El Corazón Manda" 
"We've Got to Get Together/Jingo (Medley)" 
"Rock Me"

Personnel
 Carlos Santana – guitar, vocals
 Gregg Rolie : Keyboards, lead vocals
 David Brown : Bass
 Marcus Malone : Congas, percussion
 Bob ‘Doc’ Livingstone : Drums

References 

2007 live albums
Santana (band) live albums